BMG Poland Sp. z o.o., was a Polish subsidiary of BMG founded in 1993 in Warsaw.

In 1996 BMG Poland purchased independent label Zic Zac owned by musician Marek Kościkiewicz of De Mono. At the time Zic Zac had 10% share on Polish music market with such artists in their roster as Kayah, Urszula Kasprzak, Andrzej Piaseczny, Formacja Nieżywych Schabuff, Elektryczne Gitary, and Varius Manx among others. Kościkiewicz became BMG Poland CEO, while Zic Zac was reformed to labels subsidiary. In 2001 label opened subsidiary Sissy Records with such artists as Andrzej Smolik, Cool Kids of Death, Futro, Jacek Lachowicz, Lenny Valentino, Novika, Old Time Radio and Ścianka in catalogue.

BMG Poland bestselling artists included Liroy and Varius Manx among others, with several albums certified Gold and Platinum in Poland.

In 2004 BMG Poland merged with Sony Music Entertainment Poland to Sony BMG Music Entertainment Poland, as of joint venture deal between Sony Music Entertainment and Bertelsmann Music Group.

Selected artists  
 
 Ania
 Alicja Janosz
 Andrzej Piaseczny
 Artur Gadowski
 De Mono
 De Su
 Dona
 Doktor Granat
 Elektryczne Gitary
 Ewelina Flinta
 Golden Life
 Jan Borysewicz & Paweł Kukiz
 Just 5
 Kasia Stankiewicz
 K.A.S.A.
 Lady Pank
 Lech Janerka
 Liroy
 Makowiecki Band
 Michał Żebrowski
 Robert Janson
 Sędzia Dread
 Szymon Wydra
 Urszula Kasprzak
 Varius Manx

See also 
 EMI Music Poland
 PolyGram Poland
 Universal Music Poland
 Warner Music Poland

References

Polish record labels
Former Bertelsmann subsidiaries